Only The Strong is the second album by Big Noyd.

Track listing
 Only The Strong Intro (Produced by The Alchemist)
 Watch Out (Produced by Havoc)
 Shoot 'em Up (Bang Bang) Part 1 (Produced by The Alchemist)
 Something For All That (feat. Prodigy) (Produced by Noyd Inc.)
 We Gangsta (Produced by Havoc)
 Being On Point (Prelude)
 All 4 The Luv Of The Dough (feat. Prodigy) (Produced by Havoc)
 Invincible (Produced by Havoc)
 Wildin' On The Tour Bus Skit
 Noyd Holdin' It Down (feat. Havoc) (Produced by The Alchemist)
 Shoot 'em Up (Bang Bang) Part 2 (feat. Mobb Deep) (Produced by The Alchemist)
 Air It Out (feat. Havoc) (Produced by The Alchemist)
 Higher (Produced by Emile Haynie)
 Going Right At 'em (feat. PMD) (Produced by Sebb)
 That Fire (Produced by Steve Sola)
 The Kid Is Nice (Produced by Emile Haynie) 
 N.O.Y.D. (Produced by The Alchemist)

References

2003 albums
Big Noyd albums